Thomas Ruthall   was an English politician.

He was a Member (MP) of the Parliament of England for Preston in April 1554, serving with William Berners.

References

English MPs 1554